Old Style (O.S.) and New Style (N.S.) indicate dating systems before and after a calendar change, respectively. Usually, this is the change from the Julian calendar to the Gregorian calendar as enacted in various European countries between 1582 and 1923. 

In England, Wales, Ireland and Britain's American colonies, there were two calendar changes, both in 1752. The first adjusted the start of a new year from 25 March (Lady Day, the Feast of the Annunciation) to 1 January, a change which Scotland had made in 1600. The second discarded the Julian calendar in favour of the Gregorian calendar, skipping 11 days in the month of September to do so.  To accommodate the two calendar changes, writers used dual dating to identify a given day by giving its date according to both styles of dating.

For countries such as Russia where no start of year adjustment took place, O.S. and N.S. simply indicate the Julian and Gregorian dating systems.

Britain and its colonies or possessions

In the Kingdom of Great Britain and its possessions, the Calendar (New Style) Act 1750 introduced two concurrent changes to the calendar. The first, which applied to England, Wales, Ireland and the British colonies, changed the start of the year from 25 March to 1 January with effect from "the day after 31 December 1751". (Scotland had already made this aspect of the changes, on 1 January 1600.) The second (in effect) adopted the Gregorian calendar in place of the Julian calendar. Thus "New Style" can either refer to the start of year adjustment, or to the adoption of the Gregorian calendar, or to the combination of the two.

Start of year adjustment 

When recording British history, it is usual to quote the date as originally recorded at the time of the event, but with the year number adjusted to start on 1 January. The latter adjustment may be needed because the start of the civil calendar year was not always 1 January and was altered at different times in different countries. From 1155 to 1752, the civil or legal year in England began on 25 March (Lady Day); so for example, the execution of Charles I was recorded at the time in Parliament as happening on 30 January 1648 (Old Style). In newer English language texts this date is usually shown as "30 January 1649" (New Style). The corresponding date in the Gregorian calendar is 9 February 1649, the date by which his contemporaries in some parts of continental Europe would have recorded his execution.

The O.S./N.S. designation is particularly relevant for dates which fall between the start of the "historical year" (1 January) and the legal start date, where different. This was 25 March in England, Wales, Ireland and the colonies until 1752 and until 1600 in Scotland.

In Britain, 1 January was celebrated as the New Year festival from as early as the 13th century, despite the recorded (civil) year not incrementing until 25 March, but the "year starting 25th March was called the Civil or Legal Year, although the phrase Old Style was more commonly used". To reduce misunderstandings about the date, it was normal even in semi-official documents such as parish registers to place a statutory new year heading after 24 March (for example "1661") and another heading from the end of the following December, 1661/62, a form of dual dating to indicate that in the following twelve weeks or so, the year was 1661 Old Style but 1662 New Style. Some more modern sources, often more academic ones (e.g. the History of Parliament) also use the 1661/62 style for the period between 1 January and 24 March for years before the introduction of the New Style calendar in England.

Adoption of the Gregorian calendar

Through the enactment of the Calendar (New Style) Act 1750, the Kingdom of Great Britain, the Kingdom of Ireland and the British Empire (including much of what is now the eastern part of the United States and Canada) adopted the Gregorian calendar in 1752, by which time it was necessary to correct by 11 days. Wednesday, 2 September 1752, was followed by Thursday, 14 September 1752. Claims that rioters demanded "Give us our eleven days" grew out of a misinterpretation of a painting by William Hogarth.

Other countries
Beginning in October of 1582, the Gregorian calendar replaced the Julian in Catholic countries. This change was implemented subsequently in Protestant and Eastern Orthodox countries, usually at much later dates and, in the latter case, only as the civil calendar. Consequently, when Old Style and New Style notation is encountered, the British adoption date is not necessarily intended. The 'start of year' change and the calendar system change were not always adopted concurrently. Similarly, civil and religious adoption may not have happened at the same time or even at all. In the case of Eastern Europe, for example, all of those assumptions would be incorrect.

Greece
Other countries in Eastern Orthodoxy eventually adopted Gregorian (or new style) dating for their civil calendars but most of these continue to use the Julian calendar for religious purposes. Greece was the last to do so, in 1923. There is a 13-day difference between Old Style and New Style dates in modern Greek history.

Romania
Romania officially adopted the Gregorian calendar on 1 April 1919, which became 14 April 1919. This was commemorated in 2019 by the National Bank of Romania through the release of a commemorative coin of 10silver lei.

Russia
In Russia, new style dates came into use in early 1918, when 31 January 1918 was followed by 14 February 1918: there is a 13-day difference between Old Style and New Style dates since 1 March 1900. 

It is common in English-language publications to use the familiar Old Style and/or New Style terms to discuss events and personalities in other countries, especially with reference to the Russian Empire and the very beginning of Soviet Russia. For example, in the article "The October (November) Revolution," the Encyclopædia Britannica uses the format of "25 October (7 November, New Style)" to describe the date of the start of the revolution.

The Americas
The European colonies of the Americas adopted the new style calendar when their mother countries did. In what is now the continental United States, the French and Spanish possessions did so about 130 years earlier than the British colonies. In practice, however, most surviving written records of what is now Canada and the United States are from the 20 mainland British colonies, where the British Calendar Act of 1751 was applied twenty-four  years before the United States declared independence. Canadian records also include documents of New France that reflect the New Style, as France adopted it in 1582, but the language used in the record is likely to be a good indicator of which calendar was being used for the dates given. The same logic applies to the Caribbean islands. 

In Alaska, the change took place after the United States purchased Alaska from Russia.  Friday, 6 October 1867 was followed by Friday, 18 October. Instead of 12 days, only 11 were skipped, and the day of the week was repeated on successive days, because at the same time the International Date Line was moved, from following Alaska's eastern border with Yukon to following its new western border, now with Russia.

Transposition of historical event dates and possible date conflicts

Usually, the mapping of New Style dates onto Old Style dates with a start of year adjustment works well with little confusion for events before the introduction of the Gregorian calendar. For example, the Battle of Agincourt is well known to have been fought on 25 October 1415, which is Saint Crispin's Day. However, for the period between the first introduction of the Gregorian calendar on 15 October 1582 and its introduction in Britain on 14 September 1752, there can be considerable confusion between events in Continental Western Europe and in British domains. Events in Continental Western Europe are usually reported in English-language histories by using the Gregorian calendar. For example, the Battle of Blenheim is always given as 13 August 1704. However, confusion occurs when an event involves both. For example, William III of England arrived at Brixham in England on 5 November (Julian calendar), after he had set sail from the Netherlands on 11 November (Gregorian calendar) 1688.

The Battle of the Boyne in Ireland took place a few months later on 1 July 1690 (Julian calendar). That maps to 11 July (Gregorian calendar), conveniently close to the Julian date of the subsequent (and more decisive) Battle of Aughrim on 12 July 1691 (Julian). The latter battle was commemorated annually throughout the 18th century on 12 July, following the usual historical convention of commemorating events of that period within Great Britain and Ireland by mapping the Julian date directly onto the modern Gregorian calendar date (as happens, for example, with Guy Fawkes Night on 5 November). The Battle of the Boyne was commemorated with smaller parades on 1 July. However, both events were combined in the late 18th century, and continue to be celebrated as "The Twelfth".

Because of the differences, British writers and their correspondents often employed two dates, which is called dual dating, more or less automatically. Letters concerning diplomacy and international trade thus sometimes bore both Julian and Gregorian dates to prevent confusion. For example, Sir William Boswell wrote to Sir John Coke from The Hague a letter dated "12/22 Dec. 1635". In his biography of John Dee, The Queen's Conjurer, Benjamin Woolley surmises that because Dee fought unsuccessfully for England to embrace the 1583/84 date set for the change, "England remained outside the Gregorian system for a further 170 years, communications during that period customarily carrying two dates". In contrast, Thomas Jefferson, who lived while the British Isles and colonies eventually converted to the Gregorian calendar, instructed that his tombstone bear his date of birth by using the Julian calendar (notated O.S. for Old Style) and his date of death by using the Gregorian calendar. At Jefferson's birth, the difference was eleven days between the Julian and Gregorian calendars and so his birthday of 2 April in the Julian calendar is 13 April in the Gregorian calendar. Similarly, George Washington is now officially reported as having been born on 22 February 1732, rather than on 11 February 1731/32 (Julian calendar). The philosopher Jeremy Bentham, born on 4 February 1747/8 (Julian calendar), in later life celebrated his birthday on 15 February.

There is some evidence that the calendar change was not easily accepted. Many British people continued to celebrate their holidays "Old Style" well into the 19th century, a practice that the author Karen Bellenir considered to reveal a deep emotional resistance to calendar reform.

Differences between Julian and Gregorian dates

The change arose from the realisation that the correct figure for the number of days in a year is not 365.25 (365 days 6 hours) as assumed by the Julian calendar but slightly less (c. 365.242 days): the Julian calendar has too many leap years. The consequence was that the basis for the calculation of the date of Easter, as decided in the 4th century, had drifted from reality. The Gregorian calendar reform also dealt with the accumulated difference between these figures, between the years 325 and 1582 by skipping 10 days to set the ecclesiastical date of the equinox to be 21 March, the median date of its occurrence at the time of the First Council of Nicea in 325. 

Countries that adopted the Gregorian calendar after 1699 needed to skip the additional day for each subsequent new century that the Julian calendar had added since then. When the British Empire did so in 1752, the gap had grown to eleven days;  when Russia did so (as its civil calendar) in 1918, thirteen days needed to be skipped.

Other notations
The Latin equivalents, which are used in many languages, are stili veteris (genitive) or stilo vetere (ablative), abbreviated st.v. and respectively meaning , and stili novi or stilo novo, abbreviated st.n. and meaning  The Latin abbreviations may be capitalised differently by different users, e.g., St.n. or St.N. for stili novi. There are equivalents for these terms in other languages as well, such as the German a.St. ("alten Stils" for O.S.).

See also 
 
 Difference between Gregorian and Julian calendar dates (ready-reckoner)
 
  ("Old Christmas")

Notes

References

Sources

External links

Untangling Lady Day dating and the Julian Calendar by Erin Blake (Folger Library)
The Perpetual Calendar by Toke Nørby - Details of conversion for many countries
Side-by-side Old style–New style reference by Petko Yotov
Calendar Converter by John Walker

Gregorian calendar
Julian calendar
Time in the United Kingdom